Elisabeth Chávez Hernández (born 17 November 1990) is a Spanish handball player for Nantes Loire Atlantique, a French handball club from Nantes, France and the Spanish women's national team.

She was part of the  Spanish team at the 2008 European Women's Handball Championship, where the Spanish team reached the final, after defeating Germany in the semifinal. She also competed at the 2011 World Women's Handball Championship in Brazil, where the Spanish team placed third.

References

External links

1990 births
Living people
Spanish female handball players
People from Tenerife
Sportspeople from the Province of Santa Cruz de Tenerife
Expatriate handball players
Spanish expatriate sportspeople in France
Handball players at the 2016 Summer Olympics
Competitors at the 2013 Mediterranean Games
Olympic handball players of Spain
Mediterranean Games competitors for Spain